The Second Republic of the Dominican Republic began with the restoration of the country in 1865 and culminated with the American intervention in 1916.

In the period of the Second Republic the political conflicts continued, now between the last government restored by Antonio Pimentel, the one who refuse to rule from Santo Domingo, as it was commanded by the Congress, and José María Cabral the one who had to rule from Santo Domingo, answering to the no deputation of Pimentel. Cabral remained in power and adapted the constitution.

In the administration of Cabral, the parties of colours became the owners of the political stage, especially: the Reds and the Blues. The Red Party, the most powerful party, which ruled for six consecutive years, was led by Buenaventura Báez.

Afterwards there was a succession of governments until 1887, the beginning of the dictatorship of Lilís that lasted until 1899.

Presidents

References

See also
 History of the Dominican Republic
 First Dominican Republic
 Third Dominican Republic

History of the Dominican Republic
1865 in the Dominican Republic
Government of the Dominican Republic
Politics of the Dominican Republic